The DS E-Tense is a coupé concept unveiled by DS Automobiles on February 26, 2016 and shown to the public at the Geneva Motor Show of the same year. It is fully electric and develops .

It will be showcased at the 2022 Paris Motor Show in October.

Overview

E-Tense

The first version of the concept, unveiled in 2016, was used as the basis for the second revision.

Media
It has appeared on both Asphalt 8: Airborne and Asphalt 9: Legends, as a Class D vehicle.

E-Tense Performance
The carbon body is that of the 2016 concept, onto which DS has grafted new front and rear ends that herald the styling and light signatures of its upcoming models.

References

External links
 Official website (United Kingdom)

E-Tense Performance
Electric concept cars